Godfrey Hall (born 25 May 1949) is a British auto racing driver.

Career
In 1983 he won the Monoposto Championship in what was his fourth year in the series. He progressed into the British Formula Three Championship the following year, where he spent two seasons. After spending 1987 in the British Production Saloon Championship, he competed in the British Touring Car Championship in 1988. In his debut season he finished fourth in the championship and second in class B with his BMW M3. He spent two more seasons competing in the BTCC. In 1991 he entered just one round of the BTCC's new Super Touring era at Silverstone. Since he exited the BTCC, he has competed in historic racing.

Racing record

Complete British Touring Car Championship results
(key) (Races in bold indicate pole position – 1988–1990 in class) (Races in italics indicate fastest lap – 1 point awarded ?–1989 in class)

References

External links

1949 births
Living people
English racing drivers
British Touring Car Championship drivers
British Formula Three Championship drivers